Aphelandra sinclairiana Nees ex Benth. is a plant species commonly called "coral aphelandra," "orange shrimp plant" or "Panama queen." It is a shrub up to 3 m (10 feet) high, native to Central America. It has been reported from Panama, Costa Rica, Honduras and Nicaragua. It is also cultivated in warm locations elsewhere, with pink, red, orange, or red-violet flowers and bracts.

References

Flora of Central America
Flora of Panama
Flora of Costa Rica
Flora of Nicaragua
Flora of Honduras
sinclairiana